This is a list of episodes for the NBC television series CHiPs, which ran for 139 episodes over the course of six seasons, plus one reunion TV movie from October 27, 1998.

Series overview

Episodes

Season 1 (1977–78)

Season 2 (1978–79)

Season 3 (1979–80)

Season 4 (1980–81)

Season 5 (1981–82)
In the fifth season, Ponch is substituted by the officer Steve McLeish (episode number 96).

Season 6 (1982–83)

Television film (1998)

U.S. television ratings

References

External links
 

Lists of American crime drama television series episodes
Lists of American action television series episodes
Episodes